Adara may refer to:
 Adara language, a language of Nigeria
 Adhara or Adara, the traditional name of the star Epsilon Canis Majoris
 Adara (East Timor), a town on Atauro Island, East Timor
 Adara (deity), the Qemant name for the Deity
 Adara, the fictional embodiment of hope, the emotion that powers the Blue Lantern Corps in the DC Comics universe